Sam Hynd (born 3 July 1991) is a retired British para-swimmer. He competed in the Paralympics as a S8 classification swimmer, having club feet and mild form of muscular dystrophy.

Hynd achieved significant success in the 400m Freestyle, winning gold at the 2008 Summer Paralympics, the 2009 and 2011 IPC European Championships, and the 2009 IPC World Championships. Oliver Hynd, Sam's younger brother, finished in second place at the 2011 European event.

Sam retired from competitive swimming in February 2014, at the age of 22.

Recognition
Originally suggested by Charlotte Henshaw's father, Mansfield District ward councillor Paul Henshaw, to acknowledge the achievements of Ollie Hynd, the council voted in December 2014 to name the 25-metre laned pool at the town's Water Meadows complex as Hynds and Henshaw Competition Pool, to honour Sam, his brother Ollie and Charlotte Henshaw who all trained there.

References

1991 births
Sportspeople from Mansfield
Living people
British male freestyle swimmers
Paralympic swimmers of Great Britain
Paralympic gold medalists for Great Britain
Paralympic bronze medalists for Great Britain
Swimmers at the 2008 Summer Paralympics
Swimmers at the 2012 Summer Paralympics
Medalists at the 2008 Summer Paralympics
Medalists at the 2012 Summer Paralympics
Sportspeople with club feet
S8-classified Paralympic swimmers
Medalists at the World Para Swimming Championships
Medalists at the World Para Swimming European Championships
Paralympic medalists in swimming
British male medley swimmers
21st-century British people